The Man in the Tree is a novel by Damon Knight published in 1984.

Plot summary
The Man in the Tree is a novel in which a giant can twist probability worlds, duplicating anything by borrowing another world's copy.

Reception
Dave Langford reviewed The Man in the Tree for White Dwarf #67, and stated that "Nicely written, but it provokes nagging questions. Why giantism and psychic power when either alone could carry the novel? Why such uninspired use of the hero's special talent (which tends to boil down to routine healings and conjuring)? Why, with an intelligent enemy hot on his trail, does he go on public view as a giant in a carnival? These are deep waters, Watson."

Reviews
Review by Debbie Notkin (1983) in Locus, #275 December 1983
Review by Jackson Houser (1984) in Fantasy Review, #64 January 1984
Review by Algis Budrys (1984) in The Magazine of Fantasy & Science Fiction, May 1984
Review by Tom Easton (1984) in Analog Science Fiction/Science Fact, May 1984
Review by PhullisJ. Day (1984) in Fantasy Review, July 1984
Review by Gregory Feeley (1984) in Foundation, #31 July 1984
Review by Robert Coulson (1984) in Amazing Stories, September 1984
Review by C. J. Henderson (1984) in Whispers #21-22, December 1984
Review by Chris Bailey (1985) in Vector 127

References

1984 American novels